Zsuzsa Csala (born Ilona Zsuzsanna Csala; 9 July 1933 – 22 February 2014) was a Hungarian actress from Budapest.

Filmography

References

External links

1933 births
2014 deaths
20th-century Hungarian actresses
Actresses from Budapest
Hungarian film actresses